La California is a town in Tuscany, central Italy, administratively a frazione of the comune of Bibbona, province of Livorno.

The town is about 40 km from Livorno and 6 km from Bibbona.

History 
The town developed starting from 19th century, but it has been inhabited since before: around the locality of Crocino, an Etruscan tomb from 6th century BC has been discovered.

Since 2004, and every 4 years, inhabitants of La California hold fake elections coinciding with the Presidential Elections of United States of America. The vote is obviously not taken into account for the official results, but it is sent to the nearest USA consulate in Florence.

Sport
La California is the birthplace of cyclist Paolo Bettini, who won two world championships and a gold medal at the Olympics.

References

Bibliography

External links 
 

Frazioni of the Province of Livorno